Adesmus brunneiceps is a species of beetle in the family Cerambycidae. It was described by Per Olof Christopher Aurivillius in 1920. It is known from Brazil.

References

Adesmus
Beetles described in 1920